The Pechora coal basin (Печорский угольный бассейн) is located in the Extreme North of European Russia. In covers nearly 90,000 km2 in Komi Republic and Nenets Autonomous Okrug of the Arkhangelsk Oblast.

The basin is associated with three major depressions: Usa River depression, Korotaikha depression and Kara depression, stretching North-South along the Western foothills of Northern Ural Mountains and Pay-Khoy Ridge.

Coals in the basin widely range from brown coals to anthracites, of varying yield and ash content.

See also 

 Timan-Pechora Basin

References

Geography of Russia
Komi Republic
Nenets Autonomous Okrug
Coal mining regions in Russia